Stefano Anceschi (born 18 June 1984) is an Italian former sprinter.

Biography

Anceschi was born in Scandiano. His best results at the international level got them with the Italy national relay team. He have won 6 Youth Italian championship, after to have run for the Reggio Event's track and field comes recruited from the Fiamme Gialle in 2003.  In the first phase of career it is only companion of training of Andrea Giaconi and of Silvia Cucchi but in 2004, become companion of society and athlete of Giaconi. In the beginning of 2005 had a stop for a problem to the right scafoide;After to have decided not to operate itself, succeeds to hold under control the pain reaching considerable enhancement, above all on 200 meters. In the course of the same year it wins the medal of bronze to the European under 23 of Erfurt and at the Universiade of Izmir he arrived 5th on 100 m and conquest the gold medal in the relay 4 × 100 m.

In 2006 in Turin he graduates Italian champion of 200 meters with time of 20"86. He arrived in the group of the inhaling to a place in the Italian quartet of the 4x100 relay, showing good inclination like second relay runner. He takes part to the Europeans of Göteborg, participating in the 200 m and in the 4×100 metres relay. In 200 meters he arrived at the fourth of final (where it comes disqualified for invasion of lane), while with the relay it reaches the final where a mistake in the change with Luca Verdecchia compromises the ambitions of the Italian Team of a possible medal and banishes the Italian relay to 6º place in 39"42. From 2008 he've 4 surgery to Achille's tendon that have complicate his career until now.

The 2014 represents the year of his competitive reentry after so many surgical interventions. The international reentry has happened to the meeting in Geneva of June 14. Anceschi concludes the competitive season with a convincing 10 "74 on the 100 meters. It is of good auspice for the years to come. It have decided not to run on 200 meters and to postpone the competitive reentry a following years. From April of the 2014 Anceschi is enrolled for the Atletica Riccardi team. The Riccardi is one of the most glorious of Italy and it have win many Italian badges.

Achievements

1: Disqualified in the quarterfinal.

Progression

100 meters

200 meters

National titles
Stefano Anceschi has won one national championship.
 1 win in  200 metres (2006)

See also
 Italy national relay team

References

External links
 

1984 births
Italian male sprinters
Living people
Athletics competitors of Fiamme Gialle
Universiade medalists in athletics (track and field)
Universiade gold medalists for Italy
Medalists at the 2005 Summer Universiade
Italian Athletics Championships winners
21st-century Italian people